Hot Springs High School (HSHS) is a 4-year public high school located in Truth or Consequences, New Mexico, within the Truth or Consequences Municipal Schools.

The boundary of the school district is all of Sierra County, and therefore the school's service area is that county.

In February 2007, the school had about 426 students.

The school's sports team are named Tigers.

References

External links

Public high schools in New Mexico
Buildings and structures in Sierra County, New Mexico